1914 in Argentine football saw Racing Club win its second consecutive Primera División title, apart from winning its second successive Copa Ibarguren. Porteño won the dissident FAF championship, the last tournament before both leagues AFA and FAF reunified. River Plate won domestic Copa de Competencia Jockey Club and international Copa de Honor Cousenier.

In international football Argentina won the Copa Premier Honor Argentino against Uruguay. Argentina also lost the first ever competitive game against Brazil and played friendlies against Exeter City of England and Torino F.C. of Italy.

Primera División

Asociación Argentina de Football - Copa Campeonato
Huracán made its debut in Primera División, while Ferrocarril Sud was dissolved after playing 7 matches.

Federación Argentina de Football
Tigre was ejected from the Federation after playing 14 matches while Argentino de Quilmes was disaffiliated after playing 7 games. According to the rules, Floresta had to be relegated but it finally remained in Primera due to the reunification of both leagues Asociación Argentina and Federación Argentina de Football.

Lower divisions

Intermedia
AFA champion: Honor y Patria (Floresta)
FAF champion: Defensores de Belgrano

Segunda División
AFA champion: San Lorenzo
FAF champion: Tigre Juniors

Tercera División
AFA champion: Libertarios Unidos
FAF champion: Vélez Sársfield

Domestic cups

Copa de Competencia Jockey Club
Champion: River Plate

Final

Copa Ibarguren
Champion: Racing Club

Final

International cups

Tie Cup
Champion:  River Plate

Final

River Plate: Carlos Ísola; Arturo Chiappe, Agustín Lanata; Atilio Peruzzi, Cándido García, Alfredo Elli; Roberto Fraga Patrao, Alfredo Martín, Alberto Penney, Luis Gianetto, Juan Sevesi.

Argentina national team
Argentina played their first competitive game against Brazil, a 0-1 loss in the Copa Roca.

Titiles
Copa Premier Honor Argentino 1914

Results

References

 
Seasons in Argentine football